The Electoral division of South Esk was an electoral division in the Tasmanian Legislative Council of Australia. It existed from 1856 to 1999, when it was renamed Apsley. It took its name from the South Esk River.

Members

See also
Tasmanian Legislative Council electoral divisions

References
Past election results for South Esk

Former electoral districts of Tasmania
1999 disestablishments in Australia